Married to Medicine is an American reality television series which premiered on March 24, 2013, on Bravo and was created by Mariah Huq. The series chronicles the lives of seven women in the Atlanta medical community with three of the women being doctors themselves, while the others are doctors' wives. It shows the group as they balance their social circles, careers, and families.

Overview

Episodes

Season 1 (2013)
Dr. Jacqueline, Kari, Mariah, Dr. Simone, Toya and Quad are introduced.

Season 2 (2014)
Dr. Heavenly and Lisa Nicole joined the cast of Married to Medicine; Kari departed as a series regular.

Season 3 (2015)
Mariah departed as a series regular.

Season 4 (2016–17)

Season 5 (2017–18)
Dr. Contessa joined the cast of Married to Medicine; Lisa Nicole departed as a series regular. Married to Medicine also vacated its normal Sunday slot in favor of being aired on Friday evenings. It returned to its Sunday evening timeslot full-time in Season 7 (2019).

Season 6 (2018–19)
Mariah rejoined the cast of Married to Medicine. The show began in a Sunday timeslot before being moved around between Fridays and Sundays this season.

Season 7 (2019–20)

Season 8 (2021)
Mariah and Quad departed as series regulars.

Season 9 (2022)
Quad returned as a series regular.

References

Lists of American reality television series episodes